The Hans Christian Andersen Awards are two literary awards given by the International Board on Books for Young People (IBBY), recognising one living author and one living illustrator for their "lasting contribution to children's literature". The writing award was first given in 1956, the illustration award in 1966. The former is sometimes called the "Nobel Prize for children's literature".

The awards are named after Hans Christian Andersen, the 19th-century Danish author of fairy tales, and each winner receives the Hans Christian Andersen Medaille (a gold medal with the bust of Andersen) and a diploma. Medals are presented at the biennial IBBY Congress.

History 
The International Board on Books for Young People (IBBY) was founded by Jella Lepman in the 1950s. The Hans Christian Andersen Award was first proposed in 1953 and awarded three years later, in 1956. It was established in the aftermath of World War II to encourage development of high-quality children's books. The award was set to be given biennially and was initially awarded for individual works that had been published in the preceding two years. By 1962 the award's formal criteria were amended "to a living author who is judged to have made a lasting contribution to good juvenile literature by the outstanding value of his or her work. The author's complete works, in particular those in fiction, will be taken into consideration in awarding the medal."

Runners up were listed in 1960, 1962, and 1964. In reflection of what IBBY considered to be a trend of increasing quality in picture books, the award was expanded to include illustrators in 1966. From 1966 to 1996 runners up were named as "Highly Commended". In 1998 this was replaced with a list of three to four "Finalists". It is sometimes called the "Little Nobel Prize" or the "Nobel Prize for children's literature" and has been cited as the "most important activity" of IBBY. Between 1992 and 2022 the patron of the awards was Queen Margrethe II of Denmark. A special issue of Bookbird, a journal published by IBBY, is published as the award is given out.

Jury
The winner of the Hans Christian Andersen Awards is selected by a jury which is put together by IBBY's executive committee. The Jury's president is elected by IBBY's General Assembly. There were initially seven jurors, but this was increased to eight and in 2000 to ten. Two years later, the jury was split with five members focusing on writing and the other five handling illustrations. The jurors are expected to be competent in children's literature and ideally represent a diverse group. It generally takes six months to review candidates and select a winner. 

Jella Lepman served as Jury President for the first three Andersen Awards, 1956 to 1960, and remained on the jury until her death in 1970, as the President of IBBY and then as its honorary president. Current four-year terms cover two award cycles. Other notable presidents have included Virginia Haviland (1970–1974), Patricia Crampton (1982–1986), and Ana Maria Machado (1986–1990).

Selection process
The award's regulations read: "The Hans Christian Award is presented every two years by IBBY to an author and to an illustrator, living at the time of the nomination, who by the outstanding value of their work are judged to have made a lasting contribution to literature for children and young people. The complete works of the author and the illustrator will be taken into consideration in the selection process". The award is explicitly designed to be an "international" work, and it is not explicitly given to a certain country.

IBBY has many member nationsall countries are eligible for membership. Every member nation has its own organization, known as a "national section", that is active across the country. All member nations can nominate candidates for consideration in the Hans Christian Andersen Awards. Some member states will repeatedly nominate the same author or illustrator, others nominate a new candidate each time. To nominate a candidate, a dossier is prepared that provides information including a list of works and biographical sketch. The portfolio must have between five and ten books by the candidate, which are sent to jurors, IBBY's president, and the "Jury Secretary". There were sixty-six nominees from thirty-three countries for the 2022 Hans Christian Andersen awards.

The awards are named after Hans Christian Andersen, the 19th-century Danish author of fairy tales, and each winner receives the Hans Christian Andersen Medaille, a gold medal with the bust of Andersen, and a diploma. Medals are presented at the biennial IBBY Congress.

Writing award winners

Illustration award winners

Winners by country 
The winners are most often residents of Europe and North America; the first winner from outside that region was Farshid Mesghali in 1974, from Iran. After receiving the award. many authors and illustrators have their works gain wider recognition, particularly in the form of more translations.  there have been award winners from 25 countries. Americans have received the most writing (6) and total (7) recipients. Germans have won four illustration awards.

See also 

 Astrid Lindgren Memorial Award
 List of literary awards

Notes

References

Bibliography

External links 
 "The Hans Christian Andersen Collection at Northwestern: Illustrated Children's Books from Around the World: July 27th – September 9th, 2004" — multimedia exhibit by Northwestern University Library including much information about the HCA Award and the 2004 Illustration Award in particular

Children's literary awards
Danish literary awards
Awards established in 1956
Hans Christian Andersen
 
 
International Board on Books for Young People